Tevin Vongvanich (born 31 August 1958) is a Thai businessman, and the CEO of PTT Public Company Limited, a Thai state-owned oil and gas company, and a Fortune Global 500 company, since September 2015, when he succeeded Pailin Chuchottaworn.

He has a bachelor's degree in chemical engineering from Chulalongkorn University, a master's degree in chemical engineering from Rice University, and a master's degree in petroleum engineering from the University of Houston.

References

1958 births
Living people
Tevin Vongvanich
Rice University alumni
University of Houston alumni
Tevin Vongvanich